Secondary Highway 545, commonly referred to as Highway 545, was a provincially maintained secondary highway in the Canadian province of Ontario. This  highway connected Highway 541 at Bailey Corners near Garson with the now-abandoned community of Milnet, passing through Hanmer and Capreol. It followed what is now Municipal Road 85 (Radar Road), Municipal Road 84 (Capreol Road, Dennie Street, Sellwood Avenue, and Moose Mountain Mine Road), and Milnet Road. The route featured a concurrency with Highway 69 between Hanmer and Capreol.

Highway 545 was first designated in 1956, along with many other secondary highways in Ontario. It existed until the formation of the Regional Municipality of Sudbury—now known as Greater Sudbury—in 1973, after which it became the equivalent of a county road. Today it is known in various sections as Sudbury Municipal Road 84, Sudbury Municipal Road 85, Sellwood Avenue, Milnet Road and Highway 806.

Route description 
Today Highway 545 is known between Bailey Corners and east of Hanmer as Sudbury Municipal Road 85, along the former Highway 69 concurrency as Sudbury Municipal Road 84, and north of Capreol as Sellwood Avenue, Milnet Road and Highway 806.

The route began at a junction with Highway 541 (now Sudbury Municipal Road 85) as the through route and progressed northeast and then east through a mix of farmland and undeveloped areas. This section is now known as Radar Road in addition the Municipal Road 85 designation. Southeast of Hanmer, the route curved 90 degrees north to meet with Highway 69 (Cote Boulevard, now Municipal Road 80) east of the town. It meandered northwards nearby the Vermilion River, now in the isolated forests of the Canadian Shield.

History 
The route of Highway 545 was first assumed by the Department of Highways in early 1956, along with several dozen other secondary highways. Throughout its existence, Highway 545 connected Highway 541 at Bailey Corners with Highway 69 east of Hanmer. The route continued north of the northern terminus of Highway 69 in Capreol to Milnet.
By 1965, Highway 806 branched west from Milnet to Sellwood.
The route remained unchanged until the formation of the Regional Municipality of Sudbury, now Greater Sudbury, in 1973. By 1974, the highway was transferred to the region, along with Highway 806.
Today it is known between Bailey Corners and east of Hanmer as Sudbury Municipal Road 85, along the former Highway 69 concurrency as Sudbury Municipal Road 84, and north of Capreol as Sellwood Avenue, Milnet Road and Highway 806.

Major intersections

References 

545
545
Roads in Greater Sudbury